The Women's points race event of the 2015 UCI Track Cycling World Championships was held on 18 February 2015.

Results
The race was started at 20:40.

100 laps (25 km) were raced with 10 sprints.

References

Women's points race
UCI Track Cycling World Championships – Women's points race